GMC Stadium is a 17,000-seat, plus 8,000 more with standing room, stadium in Calgary, Alberta, Canada.  It annually hosts the rodeo, the chuckwagon races and the evening grandstand show portions of the Calgary Stampede.

Thoroughbred racing on the half-mile track here ended in 2008, making the annual chuckwagon races during Stampede Week the only event that now uses the track.

In June 2022 the Stampede Grandstand was renamed GMC Stadium.

References

Sports venues in Calgary
Horse racing venues in Canada
Rodeo venues in Canada